Mehdi Ghazanfari (born 16 November 1960) is an Iranian politician and the current chairman of the National Development Fund of Iran since October 2021. He was Minister of Industries and Business from 3 August 2011 to 15 August 2013 and Minister of Commerce in the second cabinet of Mahmoud Ahmadinejad from 9 August 2009 to 3 August 2011.

References

1960 births
Living people
Government ministers of Iran
University of New South Wales alumni
Iranian industrial engineers